Sombat Uamongkol is a Thai former professional tennis player.

Uamongkol registered a highest singles world ranking of 525 and represented Thailand in the Davis Cup from 1981 to 1986. Featuring in a total of 10 Davis Cup ties, he had wins in seven singles and five doubles rubbers. He was a medalist for Thailand at both the Asian Games and Southeast Asian Games.

Since 2019, Uamongkol has served as president of the Asian Tennis Federation.

References

External links
 
 
 

Year of birth missing (living people)
Living people
Sombat Uamongkol
Asian Games medalists in tennis
Sombat Uamongkol
Medalists at the 1986 Asian Games
Tennis players at the 1986 Asian Games
Southeast Asian Games medalists in tennis
Sombat Uamongkol
Sombat Uamongkol
Sombat Uamongkol
Competitors at the 1979 Southeast Asian Games
Competitors at the 1981 Southeast Asian Games
Competitors at the 1983 Southeast Asian Games
Competitors at the 1985 Southeast Asian Games
Sombat Uamongkol